Galyanivadhanakarun Hospital is a university teaching hospital, affiliated to the Faculty of Medicine of Princess of Naradhiwas University, located in Mueang Narathiwat District, Narathiwat Province. It is located close to the new Provincial Government Office of Narathiwat Province.

History 
Construction of the hospital began in 2009 and was initially named Hospital of the Faculty of Medicine, Princess of Naradhiwas University. Its purpose was to provide a medical training site for clinical year students and become a center for medical research in the Far South of Thailand and nearby ASEAN countries such as Malaysia and Indonesia. The hospital was opened on 15 December 2014 with 22 outpatient beds. It was renamed to 'Galyanivadhanakarun Hospital' on 15 March 2015 by royal decree. The hospital plans to expand to 150 beds in the future.

See also 
Healthcare in Thailand
Hospitals in Thailand
List of hospitals in Thailand

References 

Note: This article incorporates material from the corresponding article in the Thai Wikipedia.

Teaching hospitals in Thailand
Hospitals in Thailand
Narathiwat province
Hospitals established in 2014